The 2020–25 term of the Central Military Commission (CMC) of the Communist Party of Vietnam (CPV) was appointed by a decision of the 13th Politburo. Nguyễn Phú Trọng was re-appointed for a third term as CMC Secretary, a position he has held since 2011.

Colonel General Trần Quang Phương voluntarily left office on his election as Vice Chairman of the National Assembly of Vietnam in July 2021, and Lieutenant General Trần Hồng Minh left office on his appointment as Secretary of the Cao Bằng Provincial Party Committee in September. Nguyễn Xuân Phúc, the President of Vietnam and the third-ranking member of the 2020–25 term of the CMC, voluntarily resigned from all state and party offices at the 3rd Extraordinary Plenary Session of the 13th Central Committee on 17 January 2023.

Sessions
The Central Military Commission is not a permanent institution. Instead, it convenes plenary sessions. When the CMC is not in session, decision-making powers are delegated to the Standing Committee. The Standing Board is not a permanent body either.

Officers

Composition

Standing Committee

Members

References

Bibliography

2020–25 term of the Central Military Commission of the Communist Party of Vietnam